Keyon Whiteside (born January 31, 1980 in Forest City, North Carolina) is a former American football linebacker of the National Football League. He was originally drafted by the Indianapolis Colts in the fifth round of the 2003 NFL Draft. He played college football at Tennessee

References

External links
Indianapolis Colts bio

1980 births
Living people
American football linebackers
Tennessee Volunteers football players
Indianapolis Colts players
Cincinnati Bengals players
People from Shelby, North Carolina